This is a list of aircraft of the Royal Australian Navy.

Present

Historic

A

B

C

D

E

F

G

H

K

M

N

S

V

W

Civilian aircraft operating under contract

Drones/RAV

Present

Historic

List of guided missiles of the Royal Australian Navy

Current

Historic

Notes

Australian Navy
Military equipment of the Royal Australian Navy
 
Royal Australian Navy lists